Julian Wallace Cunningham (May 1, 1893 – August 22, 1972) was a senior officer in the United States Army.

Early life and education
Born on May 1, 1893, at Blairsville, Pennsylvania, Cunningham was educated at George Washington University and received a Bachelor of Arts in 1916.

Career
Cunningham served in the Philippines between 1933 and 1935. During World War II, he is noted for being the Commanding Officer of the 112th Cavalry Regiment.

Later life and death
Cunningham died on August 22, 1972. He and his wife Margaret are buried in Arlington National Cemetery.

References

External links
Generals of World War II

1893 births
1972 deaths
United States Army personnel of World War I
United States Army generals of World War II
Columbian College of Arts and Sciences alumni
People from Indiana County, Pennsylvania
Recipients of the Distinguished Service Medal (US Army)
Recipients of the Legion of Merit
United States Army generals
University of Georgia faculty
Military personnel from Pennsylvania